El Putxet is a station of the Barcelona Metro on the FGC-operated line L7 (also known as Línia de Balmes). The station serves the El Putxet quarter of Sarrià-Sant Gervasi, and is situated under Carrer de Balmes.

When first built speculatively in 1929, the station was named Mercado as it sits right next to Mercado de Sant Gervasi. The station remained closed until 1953, when it opened as Núñez de Arce. It received its current name in 1980.

See also
List of Barcelona Metro stations
List of railway stations in Barcelona

References

External links
 
 Information and photos about the station at Trenscat.com

Barcelona Metro line 7 stations
Transport in Sarrià-Sant Gervasi
Railway stations in Spain opened in 1953